The Very Best of Cher: The Video Hits Collection is a collection of 15 of Cher's greatest music videos. The anthology includes the popular "Believe" and "If I Could Turn Back Time" as well as the obscure "Main Man".

On the album's back cover, "Song for the Lonely" is listed as "Song for the Lonely (Almighty Remix)", though it is the original video, not a remix. Conversely, the "Dov'è L'Amore" video actually uses the Emilio Estefan remix of the song.

The video collection was certified Platinum in the United States and Australia.

Formats
It was released on VHS and DVD in 2004.

Track listing
 "Believe" (Second Version)
 "If I Could Turn Back Time"
 "Save Up All Your Tears"
 "Walking in Memphis"
 "One by One" (R&B Remix)
 "Main Man"
 "I Found Someone"
 "Strong Enough"
 "Song for the Lonely" (Second Version)
 "Half-Breed"
 "We All Sleep Alone"
 "Heart of Stone" (Remix) "The Shoop Shoop Song (It's in His Kiss)"
 "Dov'è L'Amore"
 "Love Can Build a Bridge" (with Chrissie Hynde, Neneh Cherry & Eric Clapton)Excluded videos
Several music videos are not featured, most notable songs are "Love and Understanding", "All or Nothing, "The Music's No Good Without You" and "Just Like Jesse James" (though the video accompanying is a rather innocuous montage of older Cher videos) which are all featured on the CD format. Further videos that could have been added are "Take Me Home", "Hell On Wheels", "Dark Lady", "Gypsys, Tramps & Thieves", "Dead Ringer for Love", "I Got You Babe" (with Beavis and Butt-Head) and "Alive Again", all of which have music videos. Likewise, performances by Sonny & Cher that are widely used as music videos could have been included, such as the performance of "I Got You Babe" on Top of the Pops. Many of these videos were included on Cher's previous video compilation Cher - The Video Collection''. This VHS also included the so-called music video for "Many Rivers to Cross" which is absent from this DVD.

Certifications

References

See also
 Cher: Music video and DVD videography

Cher video albums
2004 video albums
Music video compilation albums
2004 compilation albums